"You Talk Too Much" is a 1960 single by New Orleans singer Joe Jones.

Background
It was written by Fats Domino's brother-in-law, Reginald Hall. Domino passed the song on to Jones who performed it during his club act. Jones recorded the song for the New Orleans-based Ric Records in New York City in 1960. It was produced by Sylvia Vanderpool Robinson who was half of the duo Mickey & Sylvia, but she was not credited for the session. The lyrics describe a significant other of the lyricist, who talks excessively about things and people the former never sees or hears.

Initially released by Ric in July 1960, the record caused legal issues with the New York City-based Roulette Records because Jones had previously recorded a version of the tune under contract with Roulette. In October 1960, the labels reached an amicable settlement in which Roulette bought the master recording from Ric. The disk switched labels on the Billboard charts where it peaked at No. 3 on the Hot 100 and No. 9 on the Hot R&B Sides.

Chart performance

Weekly charts

Year-end charts

Covers
James & Bobby Purify released a version of the song on their 1975 album, You & Me Together Forever.

References

1960 songs
1960 singles
James & Bobby Purify songs
Roulette Records singles